W. G. Grace visited Australia in 1873–74 as captain of Lord Sheffield's team.

Despite his injury problems in 1891, few doubted that Grace should captain England in Australia the following winter when he led Lord Sheffield's team to Australia in 1891–92.  Australia, led by Jack Blackham, won the three-match series 2–1.

Grace played in 8 first-class matches on the tour and scored 448 runs at 44.80 with one century which was his highest score of 159 not out.  He scored two half-centuries.  In the field, he took 17 catches but had minimal success as a bowler with only 5 wickets at a comparatively high average of 26.80 and a best analysis of 3–64.

References

External links
 CricketArchive – W.G. Grace

Bibliography

 
 
 
 
 
 
 
 
 

Australian cricket seasons from 1890–91 to 1917–18
1891